Major Chandrakanth is a 1993 Indian Telugu-language film, produced by Mohan Babu under his Sri Lakshmi Prasanna Pictures banner and directed by K. Raghavendra Rao. It stars N. T. Rama Rao, Mohan Babu, Sharada, Ramya Krishna, Nagma and has music composed by M. M. Keeravani. N. T. Rama Rao portrayed the characters of Chhatrapati Shivaji, Veerapandiya Kattabomman, Alluri Sitarama Raju, Netaji Subhash Chandra Bose in the Punyabhumi Naa Desam song.

Plot
Major Chandrakanth, a bravo courageous soldier who has been awarded Param Vir Chakra for protecting foreign tourists from a deadly terrorist G.K.. In that operation, unfortunately, his close friend Major Rajashekar is seriously injured. Before dying, Chandrakanth promises him to couple up his daughter Seeta with his son Sivaji. Due to a curveball, Sivaji becomes a gangster, associates with his friend Hema and works for a powerful politician M.P.Gnaeswara Rao a scandalous who enacts a lot of atrocities in society using his 5 sons. Once while escaping from Police Sivaji unknowingly marries Seeta and escapes. Meanwhile, Chandrakanth returns home where he leads a happy family life with his ideal wife Savitri, two daughters Dr. Bharathi and Jhansi and son Sivaji. At present, Chandrakanth encounters Gnaeswara Rao and gives a tough fight. Once in a protest when Chandrakanth is wounded when Sivaji questions his father, then he explains the glory of his country which reforms Sivaji and decides to leave his profession. To which Gnaeswara Rao disagrees and makes him caught by Police when Chandrakanth is annoyed Sivaji starts narrating the past. Once he rescues Hema from a bunch of goons, afterward, he recognizes her as a smuggler when she asks him to accomplice them, he refuses. At the same time, Sivaji's brother-in-law kills a person in an accident and the victim's demand 10 lakhs as compensation. So, to protect his family prestige, he forcibly entered the crime line. Yet, Chandrakanth is not ready to accept Sivaji, so, he leaves the house, bolts the real culprits with the help of Hema as too unwillingly carrying-out these activities. Here Chandrakanth feels proud, learns regarding his marriage, discovers Seeta as Rajashekar's daughter and happily gives his approval. Now, a tragic incident, Chandrakanth realizes that Savitri is terminally-ill as she suffers from blood cancer. At that point in time, Chandrakanth spots G.K with Gnaeswara Rao when Hema and Sivaji also follow them. In the attack, Hema dies and Chandrakanth presents Gnaeswar Rao's evil deeds before the judiciary. But he manipulates the legal proceedings and escapes from the sentence. Simultaneously, Savitri passes away when Chandrakanth takes an oath to remove these anti-social elements. So, he awakes the public and makes them to revolt. On the other side, Sivaji collects pieces of evidence against them and they decide to present it before Govt. Knowing it, Gnaeswar Rao kidnaps Chandrakanth and his family. At last, Chandrakanth proves Gnaeswar Rao as a traitor by sacrificing his life for the country.

Cast

 N. T. Rama Rao as Major Chandrakanth (Chhatrapati Shivaji / Veerapandiya Kattabomman / Netaji Subhash Chandra Bose / Alluri Sitarama Raju (for Punyabhoomi Naa Desam song))
 Mohan Babu as Sivaji
 Sharada as Savitri
 Nagma as Seeta
 Ramya Krishna as Hema
 Amrish Puri as MP Gnaeswar Rao
 Brahmanandam as Rangaraju Rikshawala
 Babu Mohan as Pulla Rao
 Srihari as Gnaeswar Rao's son
 Saikumar as Lokesh
 Rakhee as G.K.
 Gummadi as Swarajya Rao
 Paruchuri Gopala Krishna as Minister Subbarayadu
 M. Balayya as Major Rajashekar
 Rallapalli as Shamshuthen
 Narra Venkateswara Rao as Lawyer 
 Chalapathi Rao as Doctor
 Vinod as Inspector 
 Prasad Babu as Major Chandrakanth's son-in-law 
 Achyuth as Inspector Raju
 Navabharat Balaji as Gnaeswar Rao's son
 Ananth as Bridegroom 
 Ironleg Sastry as Dr. Parvathalu
 Annapurna as Parvathi
 Sudha as Dr. Bharati 
 Kinnera as Jhansi
 Siva Parvathi
 Shilpa
 Master Manchu Manoj Kumar as Major Chandrakanth grandson
 Baby Shreshta as Major Chandrakanth granddaughter

Soundtrack

Music composed by M. M. Keeravani. Music released on Lahari Music Company.

Reception 
Sita of Sivaranjani magazine appreciated Rama Rao's performance, in addition of praising story and technical aspects of the film. On the other hand, Zamin Ryot critic Alluru Rahim gave a more mixed review about the story and screenplay but appreciated Rama Rao's zeal for acting in the film.

References

External links
 
 Listen to Major Chandrakanth film songs at Raaga.com

1990s Telugu-language films
1993 films
Films directed by K. Raghavendra Rao
Films scored by M. M. Keeravani